Hans Johan "Bois" Andersson (born 9 March 1984) is a Swedish professional ice hockey player (winger), who most recently played in Växjö Lakers of the Elitserien (SEL) in the 2012–13 season.

References

External links
 

1984 births
Living people
Swedish ice hockey forwards
Frölunda HC players
Växjö Lakers players